UFC 281: Adesanya vs. Pereira was a mixed martial arts event produced by the Ultimate Fighting Championship that took place on November 12, 2022, at the Madison Square Garden in New York City, New York, United States.

Background
A UFC Middleweight Championship bout between current champion Israel Adesanya and former Glory Middleweight and Light Heavyweight Champion Alex Pereira headlined the event. The pairing previously met twice in kickboxing matchups. The first in April 2016 which Pereira won by unanimous decision. Their second meeting took place at Glory of Heroes 7 in March 2017, which Pereira won by third-round knockout.

A UFC Women's Strawweight Championship bout between current two-time champion Carla Esparza and former champion Zhang Weili took place at the event.

A lightweight bout between Matt Frevola and returning veteran Ottman Azaitar was rescheduled for this event. The pairing was previously scheduled to meet in January 2021 at UFC 257, but Azaitar was pulled from the bout and had his contract briefly terminated after it was determined that he had violated COVID-19 health and safety protocols, as he attempted to help others enter the UFC's designated safety zone during fight week.

At the weigh-ins, Ryan Spann and The Ultimate Fighter: Undefeated lightweight winner Michael Trizano missed weight. Spann weighed in at 206.6 pounds, six tenths of a pound over the light heavyweight non-title fight limit. Trizano weighed in at 147.6 pounds, one and six tenths of a pound over the featherweight non-title fight limit. Both bouts proceeded at catchweight with each being fined 20% of their individual purses, which went to their opponents former UFC Light Heavyweight Championship challenger Dominick Reyes and Seung Woo Choi respectively.

Results

Bonus awards
The following fighters received $50,000 bonuses.
Fight of the Night: Dustin Poirier vs. Michael Chandler
Performance of the Night: Alex Pereira and Zhang Weili

Aftermath
With eleven finishes, this event ties UFC Fight Night: Rockhold vs. Bisping and UFC 224 for most finishes in a single UFC event. It also ties the record for most first-round finishes in a single UFC event with seven.

See also 

 List of UFC events
 List of current UFC fighters
 2022 in UFC

References 

Ultimate Fighting Championship events
2022 in mixed martial arts
Madison Square Garden
Mixed martial arts in New York (state)
Sports in Manhattan
2022 in sports in New York (state)
2022 in sports in New York City
Sports competitions in New York City
November 2022 sports events in the United States